Saint-Louis-de-Kent is a community in Kent County, New Brunswick, Canada. It held village status prior to 2023.

Often shortened to simply Saint-Louis, the village is situated on the Kouchibouguacis River at the main entrance to Kouchibouguac National Park. It is considered as the birthplace of the Acadian Flag. A local park, parc des forgeron, celebrates the birth of this flag in 1884.

History

Saint-Louis-de-Kent was founded by Joseph Babineau in 1797. L'Académie Saint-Louis was founded in 1874 by Father Marcel-François Richard. The Congregation of Notre-Dame of Montréal founded a convent in 1879. The academy became a college in 1876, but it was closed in 1882 by Bishop James Rogers. Additional facilities included a telephone line between Quebec and Halifax.

A religious Grotto and Calvary was erected next to the Kouchibouguacis River between 1878 and 1882, and remains an important Acadian pilgrimage site. It was declared a Heritage Site in 2005.

The Saint-Louis Caisse Populaire was founded in 1938. L'École Mgr-Marcel-François-Richard was opened in 1978.

On 1 January 2023, Saint-Louis-de-Kent amalgamated with the town of Richibucto and all or part of for local service districts to form the new town of Beaurivage. The community's name remains in official use.

Demographics

Population trend 

Religious make-up (2001)

Income (2006)

Mother tongue language (2011)

Notable people

See also
List of communities in New Brunswick

Notes

References

External links

 Saint-Louis-de-Kent

Communities in Kent County, New Brunswick
Former villages in New Brunswick